The Cégep André-Laurendeau is a public French-language college in the LaSalle borough of Montreal, Quebec, Canada. It primarily serves the southwestern areas of the city of Montreal 

It is recognized for its high-quality programs. It is the only public college on the island of Montreal to offer the International Baccalaureate. The college offers 13 pre-university programs, 13 technical programs and over 15 continuing education programs. The college also has 2 research centres, it is the 4th most research-intensive college in the province of Quebec.

History
The college traces its origins to the merger of several institutions which became public ones in 1967, when the Quebec system of CÉGEPs was created. Cégep André-Laurendeau was named after André Laurendeau, a novelist, playwright, essay writer, journalist and politician in Quebec, Canada.

Programs
The Province of Quebec awards a Diploma of Collegial Studies for two types of programs: two years of pre-university studies or three years of vocational (technical) studies. The pre-university programs, which take two years to complete, cover the subject matters which roughly correspond to the additional year of high school given elsewhere in Canada in preparation for a chosen field in university. The technical programs, which take three-years to complete, apply to students who wish to pursue a skill trade.

See also
CIT Roussillon Bus No. 200  (week day bus service to the south shore)
Higher education in Quebec
List of colleges and universities named after people
List of colleges in Quebec

References

External links
  Official site

Andre-Laurendeau
Universities and colleges in Montreal
Colleges in Quebec
LaSalle, Quebec
Educational institutions established in 1973
1973 establishments in Quebec